Lex Gold CBE (born 14 December 1940) is a Scottish administrator and former footballer who was a director of Caledonian MacBrayne .

Gold was born in Lanark, and played professional football as a teenager, including an 18-month spell with Rangers. He was a civil servant for over thirty years.

Gold was chairman of Hibernian until he resigned after the club was relegated in 1998. In 1998, he was invited to deliver the Marlow (Scotland) Lecture to the Institution of Engineers and Shipbuilders in Scotland. Gold was also on the boards of NHS Lanarkshire, Scottish Enterprise, the Scottish Chamber of Commerce and the Confederation of British Industry in Scotland. Until October 2009 Gold was the executive chairman of the SPL.

References 

1940 births
Living people
Commanders of the Order of the British Empire
Association football executives
Hibernian F.C. directors and chairmen
Rangers F.C. players
Scottish footballers
Chairmen and investors of football clubs in Scotland
Sportspeople from Lanark
People from Lanark
Sportspeople from South Lanarkshire
Association footballers not categorized by position